Besouw is a surname. Notable people with the surname include:

 J. P. van Besouw, president of the Royal College of Anaesthetists
 Kristania Virginia Besouw (born 1985), Miss Indonesia 2006